The Bride of Messina is a tragedy by Friedrich Schiller; it premiered on 19 March 1803 in Weimar. It is one of the most controversial works by Schiller, due to his use of elements from Greek tragedies (which were considered obsolete at the time it was written).

In the play, Schiller attempts to combine antique and modern theatre. It is set in Sicily, at a time when Paganism and Christianity meet, thus again outlining this theme.

The work was notably adapted in two operas, Nevěsta messinská, by composer Zdeněk Fibich (premiered in 1884), and "La sposa di Messina" by the  Italian composer Nicola Vaccai (premiered in 1839). Robert Schumann wrote an overture to Die Braut von Messina, his Opus 100.

External links

 (English translation)

1803 plays
Plays by Friedrich Schiller
Tragedy plays